Kedares is a village in the Paphos District of Cyprus, located 6 km north of Kidhasi. It's located 543 m above sea level.

Topography 
The village of Kedares in the province of Pafos, is located at the foot of Troodos and at an altitude of 543 meters from the sea. The village of Kedarees is one of the most important vineyards in Cyprus. The main varieties of grapes are black and xylisteri.

References

Communities in Paphos District